Savelkoul is a surname. Notable people with the surname include:

Donald Savelkoul (1917–2004), American lawyer, politician, and businessman 
Henry J. Savelkoul (born 1940), American politician